The Shanghai Derbies (simplified Chinese: 上海德比; pinyin: Shànghǎi Débǐ) are various local derbies between the football teams of Shanghai. The term specifically refers to individual matches between the teams, but can also be used to describe the general rivalry between the different clubs. Shanghai Shenhua against Shanghai COSCO Huili (2002–2005) and Shanghai Shenhua against Shanghai Port are ranked as two of the most ferocious Shanghai Derbies.

Clubs 
As of 2023 season, there are three clubs in the Chinese Super League, China League One and China League Two that play in Shanghai:
 Shanghai Shenhua F.C. (Super League)
 Shanghai Port F.C. (Super League)
 Shanghai Jiading Huilong F.C. (League One)
Former clubs in the highest league include Shanghai COSCO Huili (Jia-A 2002–2003, CSL 2004–2005), Shanghai United (CSL 2005–2006) and Shanghai Shenxin (CSL 2010–2015). Shanghai Yuyuan and Shanghai Zobon were formerly in the second-tier league.

Official match results in the first two highest league

References

China football rivalries
Shanghai Shenhua F.C.
Shanghai Shenxin F.C.
Shanghai Port F.C.
Football in Shanghai